James Tracy Hale (October 14, 1810 – April 6, 1865) was a Republican member of the U.S. House of Representatives from Pennsylvania.

Biography
James T. Hale was born October 14, 1810 in Towanda, Pennsylvania, the son of Reuben & Wealthy Ann (Tracy) Hale.  He studied law partly with his brother-in-law, General William Patton (1799-1877), and partly with his uncle, Elias White Hale (1775-1832). He was admitted to the bar in 1832 in Lewistown, Pennsylvania and where he practiced for several years. He married Jane Walker Huston (1815-1883), daughter of Justice Charles Huston of the Pennsylvania Supreme Court and Mary Winter. Afterward Mr. Hale and his bride moved to Bellefonte, Pennsylvania where his father-in-law resided. After practicing there for a short time in 1851 he was appointed president judge of the twentieth judicial district and served in that office until 1858.

In 1858 Hale was elected as a Republican to the Thirty-sixth and in 1860 elected to Thirty-seventh Congresses and in 1862 as an Independent Republican to the Thirty-eighth Congress. During his last term he served as chairman of the United States House Committee on Claims. He was conservative in his political views and urged Congress to pass compromise resolutions soon after the outbreak of the Civil War.

He was a Christian, and a member of the Episcopal Church.

Children of James T. Hale and Jane Walker Huston: Charles H. Hale (1837–1872), James Tracy Hale (1848–1877) & George N. Hale (1850–1885).

James T. Hale, Sr. died after a short bout of typhoid fever on April 6, 1865 in Bellefonte, Pennsylvania and was there buried at Union Cemetery. He was the first cousin of Secretary of the Navy, Gideon Welles.

References

Sources

The Political Graveyard

External links 
 

Pennsylvania state court judges
Pennsylvania lawyers
1810 births
1865 deaths
People from Towanda, Pennsylvania
Independent Republican members of the United States House of Representatives
Burials in Pennsylvania
Republican Party members of the United States House of Representatives from Pennsylvania
Pennsylvania Independents
19th-century American politicians
19th-century American judges
19th-century American lawyers